French California is a 2006 French film directed and written by Jacques Fieschi, based on short story by Georges Simenon. It was nominated for César Awards for Best Supporting Actress (Mylène Demongeot) and Most Promising Actor (Radivoje Bukvic). It was screened in the Un Certain Regard section at the 2006 Cannes Film Festival.

Cast
Nathalie Baye as Maguy 
Roschdy Zem as Mirko 
Ludivine Sagnier as Helène 
Mylène Demongeot as Katia 
Radivoje Bukvic as Stefan 
Xavier De Guillebon as Francis 
Caroline Ducey as Lila

Accolades

References

External links

2006 films
2000s French-language films
2006 drama films
Films based on Belgian novels
Films based on works by Georges Simenon
Films directed by Jacques Fieschi
French drama films
2006 directorial debut films
2000s French films